Malcolm Johnston
is a Canadian soccer player who currently plays for MLS Next Pro side Whitecaps FC 2. He is the brother of Celticplayer Alistair Johnston.

Early life
His family lived in Aurora, Ontario, five minutes from ice hockey player’s Connor McDavid’s house. Malcolm reportedly could also have played ice hockey to a professional standard but pursued a soccer career, as had his older brother Alistair.

Career

Early career
Johnston played for Vaughan Azzurri from the age of 14 until graduating Aurora High School in 2019. From 2016-2019 he captained his team at Vaughan. He also made a couple of appearances for the senior team in League1 Ontario. He played four seasons for the University of Maryland from 2019. From the second season onward he was chosen as captain and entrusted with the role of designated penalty taker, due in part to his calm demeanour.  Coach Sasho Cirovski described him as a “cool cat”. It was a successful decision as Johnston proved adept at scoring from the spot.

2022 and SuperDraft
He finished the season as the top scorer in 2022 for the Maryland Terrapins with six goals and was also credited with eight assists. He was also awarded the Terrapins ‘goal of the season’ with a bicycle kick against Rutgers University.  Johnston entered the 2023 MLS SuperDraft and was selected in the first round of the draft by New York City FC with the 26th overall pick.

Professional
On February 28, 2023, Johnston signed with MLS Next Pro side Whitecaps FC 2.

Personal life
His brother is the Canadian international soccer player Alistair Johnston.

Career statistics

References

Living people
2001 births
Canadian soccer players
Association football midfielders
Maryland Terrapins men's soccer players
Vaughan Azzurri players
Canadian expatriate sportspeople in the United States
Canadian expatriate soccer players
Canadian people of Northern Ireland descent
Date of birth missing (living people)
New York City FC draft picks
Whitecaps FC 2 players